Abe Lincoln in Illinois is a 1940 biographical historical drama film that depicts the life of Abraham Lincoln from his departure from Kentucky until his election as President of the United States. In the UK, the film is known by the alternate title Spirit of the People. The film was adapted by Grover Jones and Robert E. Sherwood from Sherwood's 1938 Pulitzer Prize-winning play of the same name. It was directed by John Cromwell.

The film stars Raymond Massey and Howard da Silva, who reprised their roles from the original Broadway production of Abe Lincoln in Illinois, playing Abe Lincoln and Jack Armstrong respectively. Herbert Rudley, who had portrayed Seth Gale in the play, also repeated his role in the film version. The film also marks the screen debut of Ruth Gordon in the role of Mary Todd Lincoln.

The film received Academy Award nominations for Best Actor in a Leading Role (Raymond Massey) and Best Cinematography, Black-and-White (James Wong Howe).

Plot
Abe Lincoln (Raymond Massey) leaves home for the first time, having been hired along with two of his friends by Denton Offutt (Harlan Briggs) to take a load of pigs by water to New Orleans. When the boat gets stuck at a dam at the settlement of New Salem, Abe sees and loses his heart to Ann Rutledge (Mary Howard), the beautiful daughter of the local tavern keeper. When Denton later offers him a job at the store he has decided to set up in New Salem, Abe readily accepts.

Abe discovers, however, that Ann already has a beau. Nonetheless, he settles in, making himself the most popular man around with his ready, good-natured humor, and taking lessons from schoolteacher Mentor Graham (Louis Jean Heydt). When his rival for Ann's affections leaves to better himself, Ann waits for him two years before receiving a letter from him in which he states he does not know when he will return. Abe seizes the opportunity to express his love for her; she is unsure of her feelings for him and asks for a little time. She soon dies from "brain fever", telling Abe on her deathbed that she could have loved him.

Abe is asked to run for the State Assembly. He reluctantly accepts and wins, but after his first term in Springfield, Illinois, he decides to study the law instead. When Mary Todd (Ruth Gordon) visits her sister Elizabeth Edwards (Dorothy Tree) and her wealthy, influential husband Ninian (Harvey Stephens), a party is held in her honor. All the eligible bachelors show up, including Abe's fiercest political rival, Stephen Douglas (Gene Lockhart). However, it is the homely, unpolished Abe who catches Mary's fancy, much to her sister's chagrin. Ambitious, Mary senses greatness in him and is determined to drive him to his rightful destiny, despite his lack of ambition. Abe does ask her to marry him, but changes his mind at the last minute, discomfited by her drive, and leaves town. After thinking things over, however, he asks for her hand again. She accepts. Years pass, and they have several children.

With a presidential election looming, Abe's party is so split that the favorites are unacceptable to all. The party leaders compromise on "dark horse" Abe Lincoln. He engages in a series of debates with Stephen Douglas, the opposing candidate. A main issue is slavery. In a stirring speech, Abe contends that "a house divided against itself cannot stand". He wins the election. As the film ends, Abe bids his friends goodbye and boards the train to go to Washington, DC.

Cast

Production
Filming took place in Eugene, Oregon.

Reception
The film recorded a loss of $740,000, making it one of the biggest financial disasters in RKO's history; however, in the states of Illinois and Indiana where it was heavily promoted prior to release, it was the highest grossing film in most theaters.  Nationwide, it was not a financial success, losing out to a number of high grossing films such as Rebecca, Foreign Correspondent, Pinocchio, The Grapes of Wrath, Fantasia, The Sea Hawk, Our Town, Santa Fe Trail, The Letter, Northwest Passage and Pride and Prejudice, all of which did very well at the box office.

Adaptations to other media
Abe Lincoln in Illinois was dramatized as an hour-long radio play on the April 22, 1940, broadcast of Lux Radio Theater, again starring Raymond Massey as Lincoln. It was also adapted to the February 8, 1948, broadcast of the Ford Theatre.

References

External links

 
 
 
 
 

1940 films
1940s biographical drama films
1940s historical drama films
American biographical drama films
American historical drama films
Films about Abraham Lincoln
American black-and-white films
1940s English-language films
Films scored by Roy Webb
American films based on plays
Films directed by John Cromwell
Films set in Illinois
Films set in the 1850s
Films set in the 1860s
Films shot in Eugene, Oregon
RKO Pictures films
1940s American films